Nicolai Klindt (born 29 December 1988 in Outrup, Denmark) is a Danish speedway rider who won the 2007 Individual Under-19 European title.

Career
In 2006, Klindt won the Danish Under 21 Individual Speedway Championship and followed up the success by winning the 2007 European U19 title.

In 2008, he signed for his first British league team Wolverhampton Wolves for the 2008 Elite League speedway season and also won his second Danish U21 title. He spent two more seasons at Wolves, improving his average to 6.91, making his debut for Denmark in the 2009 Speedway World Cup and winning a silver medal at the 2010 Speedway World Cup. He switch to the Swindon Robins in 2011 before returning to Wolves for the 2012 and 2013 seasons.

Over the next few seasons he rode for various clubs from 2014 to 2016. During the 2017, 2018 and 2019 seasons Klindt rode for Poole Pirates and helped them win the SGB Premiership 2018 and the 2017 and 2019 Premiership Shield. The following season he signed for Ipswich Witches but the 2020 season was curtailed by the COVID-19 pandemic, however he returned to ride for them during the SGB Premiership 2021.

In 2022, he joined the King's Lynn Stars for the SGB Premiership 2022. Also in 2022, he helped SES win the 2022 Danish Super League. In 2023, he re-signed for King's Lynn for the SGB Premiership 2023.

Highlights
2005 Team Danish Championship winners
2005 - Team U-21 World Championship 3rd place (5 points)
2006 Individual U-21 Danish Championship
2006 Individual U-19 Danish Championship
2006 Polish Under-21 Pairs Championship bronze medal
2006 Team Polish Championship winners
2006 - Team U-21 World Championship 3rd place (12 points)
2007 - Team U-21 World Championship 2nd place in Semi-Final A (8 points)''
2007 Individual U-19 European Championship champion (14 points)
2008 - Team U-21 World Championship 2nd place (12 points)
2008 Individual U-21 Danish Championship
2009 - Team U-21 World Championship Runner-up (13 pts)
2009 - Individual U-21 World Championship - 6th place (10 pts)

See also
Denmark speedway team

References

1988 births
Living people
Danish speedway riders
Individual Speedway Junior European Champions
King's Lynn Stars riders
Leicester Lions riders
Peterborough Panthers riders
Poole Pirates riders
Scunthorpe Scorpions riders
Sheffield Tigers riders
Swindon Robins riders
Wolverhampton Wolves riders
Workington Comets riders